Newcastle is a village in the rural south west of Shropshire, England. It lies at the confluence of the River Clun and the Folly Brook, 3 miles west of the small town of Clun. The B4368 runs through the village, on its way between Craven Arms in Shropshire to Newtown in Powys.

The village has a community hall, a campsite (Clun Valley Camping), a church and a pub (the "Crown Inn").

The Parish
Newcastle on Clun is a civil parish which covers the village and surrounding countryside, reaching the border with Wales to the north. It is part of the remote and very rural Clun Forest, part of the Shropshire Hills AONB. Offa's Dyke and Offa's Dyke Path run through the area. The parish forms part of the Clun electoral division of Shropshire Council.

Church
The Church of England parish church, dedicated to St John the Evangelist, was built by Shrewsbury architect Edward Haycock, Sr. in 1848. As a memorial to the First World War, electric lighting was installed in the building. The churchyard contains war graves of a soldier of World War I and another of World War II.

Newcastle A.F.C.
An association football club exists in the village, called Newcastle A.F.C. or Newcastle Football Club, whose home ground is the Mill Field, situated to the southwest of the village between the B-road and the Folly Brook. Despite being based in England they play in the Mid Wales South League (part of the Welsh football league system) and were the League Champions in the 2011–12 season. They are currently sponsored by the Crown Inn. Another Shropshire village, also in the southwest of Shropshire, also previously had a team playing in the same league: Bucknell.

See also
Listed buildings in Newcastle on Clun

References

External links

Newcastle Football Club

Villages in Shropshire
Civil parishes in Shropshire